Given a size pair   where  is a manifold of dimension

 for each , 
 

In other words, the size functor  studies the
process of the birth and death of homology classes as the lower level set changes.
described by oriented trees, called  − trees.

The concept of size functor was introduced as an extension to homology theory and category theory of the idea of size function.  The main motivation for introducing the size functor originated  by the observation that the size function  can be seen as the rank

The concept of size functor is strictly related to the concept of persistent homology group, studied in persistent homology. It is worth to point out that the -th persistent homology group coincides with the image of the homomorphism .

See also
 Size theory
 Size function
 Size homotopy group
 Size pair

References

Algebraic topology
Category theory